Chalcopoecila ornata is a species of beetles in the family Buprestidae.

Description
Chalcopoecila ornata can reach a length of 20 millimetres (0.79 in). Basic color of the body is metallic green, with paler transversal bands or spots on the elytra.

Distribution
This species can be found in Argentina.

References

 Chalcopoecila ornata at Biolib
 Chalcopoecila ornata at Coleoptera Neotropical

External links
 
 Chalcopoecila ornata at insectoid.info

Buprestidae
Beetles described in 1840